Arwidssonia is a genus of fungi in the family Hyponectriaceae.

Species
As accepted by Species Fungorum;
Arwidssonia empetri 
Arwidssonia loiseleuriae

References

External links
Index Fungorum

Xylariales